Istok is a rural locality (a settlement) in Pribaykalsky District, Republic of Buryatia, Russia. The population was 142 as of 2010. There are 4 streets.

Geography 
Istok is located 110 km northeast of Turuntayevo (the district's administrative centre) by road. Turka is the nearest rural locality.

References 

Rural localities in Okinsky District